The Portrait (1935) is a painting by the Belgian surrealist René Magritte.

It depicts an almost photo-realistic table setting with a slice of ham in the center, with an eye staring back at the viewer from the center of the ham.

This painting was once part of the private collection of the surrealist painter Kay Sage. In 1956 she donated it as a gift to the Museum of Modern Art in New York City.

References

Paintings by René Magritte
Surrealist paintings
1935 paintings
Food and drink paintings